The Comedy Game is an Australian television comedy anthology series that aired in 1971 and 1973 on ABC. The new comedies screened in the series were seen as possible pilots for a full television series.

The episodes led to the series Our Man in Canberra in 1971, A Nice Day at the Office in 1972, The Aunty Jack Show in 1972, Flash Nick From Jindivick in 1974 and Scattergood: Friend of All in 1975.

Season 1

Our Man in Canberra
 Jeff Ashby as Humphrey Sullivan
 Robyn Nevin as Kate Sullivan
 Walter Sullivan as The Minister

A Nice Day at the Office
 John Bell as Sean Crisp 
 Neil Fitzpatrick as Ted Harvey 
 Fay Kelton as Vicki Short
 Kevin Lesley as Claude Fogarty

Use No Hooks
 Keith Lee 
 John Hamblin
 Grahame Bond

Gaudeamus Igitur
 Jacki Weaver
 Arna-Maria Winchester

Scattergood
 Max Cullen
 Moya O'Sullivan
 Alfred Sandor

Aunty Jack’s Travelling Show
 Grahame Bond as Aunty Jack

Arthur 
 Michael Aitkens
 Sheila Kennelly
 Judy Morris

Season 2

Fat Max 
 Barry Lovett
 Graham Rouse 
 Olivia Hamnett

Catch What I Mean?
 John Meillon
 Moya O'Sullivan
 Graham Rouse

Birth, Death and Marriage
 Garry McDonald
 Jacki Weaver
 Peter Sumner

The Engagement Party
 Ron Frazer
 John Krummel
 Sue Walker

Flash Nick from Jindavick
 Grahame Bond
 John Meillon
 Martin Harris

The Only One Left
 Garry McDonald
 Terry Bader
 Walter Sullivan

Basically Black

Basically Black was the first television program written and created by Indigenous Australians, and starred:

 Aileen Corpus
 Gary Foley

 Zac Martin
 Bob Maza

 Bindi Williams

References

External links
 

Australian Broadcasting Corporation original programming
Australian comedy television series
1971 Australian television series debuts
English-language television shows
Black-and-white Australian television shows